The Royal College Union (RCU) is the alumni association of the Royal College Colombo. Founded in 1891 as a society for alumni of the college, it is the oldest such alumni society in Sri Lanka. The Royal College Union was set up to further the interests of the College and its past and present members, and to keep former pupils in touch with each other and with the school. Annually the RCU organizes many sporting events including the Royal-Thomian, the Bradby Shield Encounter, the Royal Thomian Regatta as well as national initiatives such as EDEX and carry out development projects for the college, as well as manage and maintain much of the school's infurstutcure such as the Hostel, Royal College Sports Complex, the J.R. Jayawardene Sports Complex, RCU Skills Centre and the Swimming Pool.

Governance
RCU is governed by the Royal College Union Council. The council consists of honorary officers — the President and Vice-Presidents. The ex officio post of President is held by the Principal of Royal College Colombo and Vice Presidents are distinguished Old Royalists who are appointed as patrons of the RCU. The officer posts of the council include Secretary, Assistant Secretary, Treasurer, Assistant Treasurer and Recorder. Therefore, the de facto head of the RCU is its Secretary.

The full membership of the RCU council is much larger, which includes trustees; past secretaries; board and committee members of ORGACO (Old Royalists Groups Associations & Clubs Organizers), EDEX, Management Boards, Clubs, RCU Trust, Age group members and appointed members.

Council
The RCU Council is made up of members representing the RCU Trust, several Management Boards, clubs and age groups. These include;

 RCU Trust
 RCU Archives
 Old Royalists Groups Associations & Clubs Organizers (ORGACO)

Board of Management
Swimming Pool	
J.R. Jayawardene Sports Complex
Royal College Sports Complex
Hostel Advisory & Management Board
Career Guidance, Counselling & Skills Development Centre	

Clubs
 Royal College Union Tennis Club	
 Royal College Union Aquatic Club

Age groups
Age Group Over 55
Age Group 45 - 55	
Age Group 35 - 45	
Age Group 25 - 35	
Age Group Below 25

Committees
Finance Committee
Games Council
Rugby Matches Organising Committee
Cricket Advisory & Management Committee
Royal – Thomian cricket match Organising committee
Royal -Thomian Old Boys Cricket Match Committee
Athletics  Advisory & Management committee
Football Advisory & Management Committee
Table Tennis Advisory & Management Committee
Badminton Advisory & Management committee
Boxing Advisory & Management Committee
Baseball Advisory & Management Committee
Rowing Advisory & Management Committee
Loyalty Pledge Management Committee
Merchandise Advisory & Management Committee
Membership Development & Services Committee
School Admission Advisory & Management Committee
Constitutional Affairs Advisory Committee
ICT (Computing) Advisory & Management Committee
RCU Web Committee
Dance Organising Committee
Committee for Commemoration of Old Royalists Killed in Action (Com CORK)
Constitutional Affairs & Legal Advisory Committee
EDEX Advisory & Management Committee
Public Relations & Publicity Advisory & Management Committee
Volleyball Advisory & Management Committee

RCU Secretaries
List of Secretaries;
Sir James Peiris, JP (1891–1893)
F.M. De Saram (1893–1903)
Justice E. W. Jayewardene, KC (1903–1908)
Colonel T. G. Jayewardene, JP, CLI (1908–1915)
B.F. De Silva (1915–1921)
L.J.M Pieris (1921–1923)
F.C.W. Vangeyzel (1923–1925)
L.J.M Pieris (1925–1926)
F.C.W. Vangeyzel (1926–1933)
J. R. Jayawardene (1933–1938)
A.S. Mohammed  (1936–1938)
Colonel F. C. de Saram, OBE, CA (1938–1941)
C. E. Jayewardene (1941–1942)
G.R.J. De Soysa (1942–1945)
L.G. Weeramantry (1945–1949)
Mahesa Ratnam (1949–1950)
S.A. Dissanayake (1950–1953)
E.L.P. Mendis (1953–1955)
M. Mohideen (1955–1961)
J.W. Subasinghe (1961-1964)
L.W. Modnage (1964-1969)
Nihal Seneviratne (1969-1971)
Deshamanya Ken Balendra (1971-1973)
M. Kanagashingham (1973-1981)
C.R. Kuruppu (1981-1982)
Gamini  Edirisinghe (1986-1991)
Asoka Jayasinghe (1991-1995)
Uddaka Tennakoon (1995-1999)
Mahen Perera (1999-2001)
Nimal  Dias Jayasinha (2001-2003)
Captain  Ajith  Peiris (2003-2005)
Abhaya  Amaradasa (2003-2005)
R. Udayakumar (2005-2007)
Rizan Nazeer (2007-2010)
Manju Ariyaratne (2010–2013)
Chandana L Aluthgama (2013–2015)
Athula Munasinghe (2015–2018)
Mithila Mendis (2019–Present)

References

External

 

 
Union
Organizations established in 1891
1891 establishments in Ceylon